FlatOut 4: Total Insanity (stylized as FL4TOUT TOTAL INSANITY) is a 2017 racing video game developed by Kylotonn. It is the fourth game in the FlatOut series.

Gameplay
FlatOut 4: Total Insanity is a racing video game that features local and online multiplayer.

Development and release
FlatOut 4: Total Insanity was developed by French studio Kylotonn and published by Bigben Interactive. The game was released on the PlayStation 4 and Xbox One video game console on 17 March 2017, while the Windows version was released on 4 April.

Reception

FlatOut 4: Total Insanity received "mixed or average" reviews from professional critics according to review aggregator website Metacritic.

References

2017 video games
PlayStation 4 games
Nacon games
Video games developed in France
Windows games
Xbox One games
FlatOut
Strategy First games
Kylotonn games
Vehicular combat games
Multiplayer and single-player video games